Bandar Sri Sendayan is a planned township in the Rantau ward of Seremban District, Negeri Sembilan, Malaysia. It is the western suburb within the Seremban city proper, bordering Port Dickson District.

Bandar Sri Sendayan is the flagship project of Matrix Concepts.

Background
Bandar Sri Sendayan has 21% of total the development is parkland, with the remainder residential, commercial, institutional, agricultural and leisure development.

Location & accessibility

Car
Located within the borders of the Rantau state constituency, Bandar Sri Sendayan is a 20-minute drive (about ) from downtown Seremban via Federal Route 195, which also connects this development to North–South Expressway Southern Route Exit 218.

Jalan FELDA Sendayan Federal Route 1265 serves as a shortcut to the route to Port Dickson Federal Route 53.

Public transportation
 Labu,  Tiroi and  Seremban stations are the closest rail stations to the development.

Community living 
A relatively large town park measuring at 26-acre, one of the attractions of Bandar Sri Sendayan with outdoor facilities such as badminton court, skate park, pond, amphitheatre, football field, playground, reflexology path, basketball court, fitness station, community hall, jogging track, viewing deck & tower, tai chi area, etc.

d'Tempat Country Club 

d'Tempat Country club is a component of the planned township. It was built in accordance with the Malaysia Green Building Index (GBI) standards and awarded provisional Gold Certification in Design Assessment Stage under Non-Residential New Construction Category on 6 November 2013.

Government Funded School 
1. SJK(C) Bandar Sri Sendayan
2. SK Sendayan
3. SJK(T) Bandar Sri Sendayan

Matrix Global Schools

Future development

High-speed rail (HSR) 

Malaysia Vision Valley (MVV) 
Malaysian Vision Valley (MVV) is set to be an integrated development, to be built under the Eleventh Malaysia Plan (11MP). Spanning across a proposed area of 108,000 hectares, MVV will be located in western Negeri Sembilan - covering Seremban, Nilai and Port Dickson in both Seremban and Port Dickson Districts. Poised to transform Seremban into an investor-friendly central business district and western Negeri Sembilan into a world-class metropolis, MVV is expected to generate massive investment and development in the next 30 years.

MVV mega projects will include upgrading and construction of existing and new roads. These projects will help ease the congestion in the Klang Valley, which is in line to complement the development of the Greater KL area. Currently the MVV is now in its second iteration (MVV 2.0.).

Politics
Though administered as part of Seremban, Bandar Seri Sendayan actually falls within the borders of Rembau parliamentary constituency, currently represented by Khairy Jamaluddin.

On the state level, Bandar Seri Sendayan falls under Rantau state constituency, represented by former Menteri Besar of Negeri Sembilan, Dato' Seri Mohamad Hasan.

References

Geography of Negeri Sembilan
Seremban District